The Conners is an American television sitcom created for ABC as a retitled direct continuation of the  sequel to the series Roseanne. The series is produced by Werner Entertainment, with Bruce Helford serving as showrunner and features actors John Goodman, Laurie Metcalf, Sara Gilbert, Lecy Goranson, Michael Fishman, Emma Kenney, Ames McNamara, Jayden Rey and Jay R. Ferguson.

Development on a spin-off began following the cancellation of Roseanne in May 2018, due to controversial comments by its star Roseanne Barr on Twitter. The next month, ABC ordered the series and confirmed the adult principal cast's involvement, while Kenney, McNamara and Rey were confirmed in August. The series premiered on October 16, 2018, airing in the Tuesday 8:00 p.m. slot its predecessor was scheduled to hold during the 2018–19 television season. On October 26, 2018, ABC ordered an extra episode, bringing the episode order to eleven.

On March 22, 2019, the series was renewed for a second season of 13 episodes. On May 14, 2019, ABC ordered six extra episodes, expanding the order to 19. An additional episode was then ordered, with season 2 totaling 20 episodes. The second season premiered on September 24, 2019. On May 21, 2020, ABC renewed the series for a third season, and it was announced that season 3 would move from Tuesday to Wednesday, which premiered on October 21, 2020. On May 14, 2021, the series was renewed for a fourth season, which premiered on September 22, 2021.

On May 13, 2022, the series was renewed for a fifth season, which premiered on September 21, 2022. On October 12, 2022, ABC expanded the series' fifth season to feature its largest season to date, ordering 22 episodes for the 2022–23 U.S. TV season, which is expected to conclude in May 2023.

Premise
The show follows the Conners, a working-class family struggling to get by on modest household incomes. After the death of the original show's lead character Roseanne, they are forced to face the daily struggles of life in the fictional mid-state exurb of Lanford, Illinois, in a way they never have before.

While the show follows on from the series Roseanne, producer Bruce Helford has explained that the creative staff have chosen to deliberately ignore certain developments from the sixth season of Roseanne onwards.  This includes Jackie's marriage to Fred and the birth of her son Andy; the birth of Roseanne and Dan's fourth child, Jerry; and nearly all of Roseannes controversial ninth season.

Cast and characters

Main
 John Goodman as Dan Conner
 Laurie Metcalf as Jackie Harris-Goldufski
 Sara Gilbert as Darlene Conner
 Lecy Goranson as Becky Conner-Healy
 Michael Fishman as D.J. Conner (seasons 1–4)
 Emma Kenney as Harris Conner-Healy
 Ames McNamara as Mark Conner-Healy
 Jayden Rey as Mary Conner
 Maya Lynne Robinson as Geena Williams-Conner (season 1; guest season 3)
 Jay R. Ferguson as Ben Olinsky (season 3–present; recurring season 1–2), Darlene's former boss and, as of the end of season four, her husband

Recurring
 Katey Sagal as Louise Conner (née Goldufski), a former high school classmate of Roseanne, Dan and Jackie. She is Becky's co-worker who plays music on the side, and is eventually Dan's wife.
 James Pickens Jr. as Chuck Mitchell, Dan's best friend and former business partner
 Rene Rosado as Emilio Rodriguez, Becky's husband and the father of her daughter Beverly Rose
 Estelle Parsons as Beverly Harris (season 1–3, 5–present), Jackie and Roseanne's mother
 Johnny Galecki as David Healy (season 1–2), Darlene's ex-husband; father of her two children
 Natalie West as Crystal Anderson (season 1), a longtime family friend who married Dan's father, Ed, Sr. and is mother of Dan's two half-siblings, Ed Jr. and Angela, and his step-brother, Lonnie
 Matthew Broderick as Peter (season 1), Jackie's freeloader boyfriend
 Eliza Bennett as Odessa (season 2), Harris' friend with whom she temporarily moves in with
 Noel Fisher as Ed Conner Jr. (season 2), Dan's half-brother
 Alexandra Billings as Robin (season 3–5), a supervisor at Wellman Plastics and Darlene's mentor
 Nat Faxon as Neville Goldufski (season 3–present), Louise's brother who is a veterinarian and who later becomes Jackie's husband
 Evelina Fernandez as Juanita (season 3), a co-worker of Darlene and Becky's at Wellman's who worked with Roseanne and Jackie
 Fernandez had previously recurred as Juanita in the first season of Roseanne
 Brian Austin Green as Jeff (season 3–4), a co-worker of Darlene's at Wellman's
 Andrew Leeds as Nick (season 4), Darlene's boyfriend
 Matt Walsh as Glen (season 4), Becky's professor and boyfriend
 Christopher Lloyd as Lou (season 4), Bev's retirement home boyfriend and later Mark's contrabassoon teacher
 William H. Macy as Smitty (season 5)

Guests 
 Mary Steenburgen as Marcy Bellinger, a neighbor whom Roseanne obtained prescription pills from
 Juliette Lewis as Blue, David Healy's new girlfriend Lewis and Galecki previously played siblings in National Lampoon's Christmas Vacation.
 Justin Long as Neil, Darlene's brief love interest. She later breaks up with him when she realizes she is attracted to Ben.
 Sarah Chalke as Andrea, the woman for whom Becky was planning to be a surrogate in the tenth season of Roseanne
 Chalke had portrayed Becky Conner in seasons 6 & 7 (after Lecy Goranson left the show to attend college), three  episodes of 8 (when Lecy Goranson came back but was unavailable) and all of nine (when Lecy Goranson left again)
 Peter Gallagher as Brian Foster, lawyer for Dan in episode "Rage Against the Machine"
 Lucy Punch as Kyle's mom
 Patrick Fabian as James
 Dan Aykroyd as one of Dan's poker buddies in "The Preemie Monologues"
 Aykroyd had co-starred with John Goodman in the 1998 movie Blues Brothers 2000
 Paul Reubens as Sandy Bitensky, a local newspaper reporter
 Cheryl Hines as Dawn, a food vendor for the Lunch Box whom Jackie befriends
 Clark Gregg and Jennifer Grey as Ron and Janelle, a married couple who befriend Jackie and want her to engage in a "throuple" relationship with them
 Ozzy Osbourne and Sharon Osbourne as themselves
 Paul Hipp as Zack, keyboard player and Louise's brief love interest
 Joel Murray as Jim, Dan's longtime contact at the local bank
 Danny Trejo as Tito, a neighbor of the Conners suffering from expensive health bills
 Candice Bergen as Barb Olinsky, Ben's aloof mother, who reveals Ben's late dad was not his biological father
 Sarah Baker as Helen
 Milo Manheim as Josh, Harris' activist boyfriend
 Steve Agee as Tony
 Patton Oswalt as Don Blansky, the manager of the local cemetery
 Fred Savage as Dr. Harding
 Danielle Harris as Molly Tilden
 Harris had previously recurred as Molly Tilden during the fifth season of Roseanne
 Aaron Rodgers as himself, appearing as a guest host on Jeopardy!
 Jason Alexander as Pastor Phil
 Darien Sills-Evans as Mike
 Tony Cavalero as Aldo, Harris' surprise wedding date
 Andrea Anders as Helen
 Joe Walsh as Jesse, Aldo's father
 Ethan Cutkosky as Caleb
 Ever Carradine as Pamela Finch
 Barry Livingston as Mr. Nelson
 Jane Curtin as Doris Goldufski
 Eric Allan Kramer as Bobo

Episodes

Production

Development
On May 29, 2018, ABC cancelled Roseanne despite initially renewing it for an eleventh season, following controversial Twitter remarks made by Roseanne Barr (who starred as Roseanne Conner) about Valerie Jarrett, a former advisor to former president Barack Obama. In June, reports swirled that the show could possibly continue under a different title and focus on the Darlene character; the show ultimately continued but focused on the Conner family as a whole, becoming more of an ensemble cast. Around June 15, 2018, reports emerged that ABC was close to making a deal to indeed continue the show. Barr is not involved in any way in the new program, and likely received a one-time payment in return.  John Goodman had stated that Roseanne Conner would be killed off, which indeed was the case.

In June, 2018, ABC ordered a 10-episode spin-off tentatively titled The Conners, and that rather than focusing on Darlene, it would involve every cast member except Barr. On August 28, 2018, Emma Kenney, Ames McNamara, and Jayden Rey, who starred as Harris Conner-Healy, Mark Conner-Healy, and Mary Conner, respectively, throughout the tenth season of Roseanne, were officially confirmed as series regulars for The Conners. On December 15, 2018, it was reported by Deadline Hollywood that preliminary negotiations were underway with the cast for a second season. Deadline later reported on March 21, 2019 that renewal was close. On March 22, 2019, ABC renewed the show for a 19-episode second season, which premiered on September 24, 2019.

On May 21, 2020, ABC renewed the series for a third season, which premiered on October 21, 2020. On March 18, 2021, the show's sound engineer and boom operator Terrel Richmond died after suffering a medical event on set. On May 14, 2021, ABC renewed the series for a fourth season, which premiered on September 22, 2021 with a live episode.

Katey Sagal plays John Goodman's character Dan Conner's wife on the series. Both Sagal and Roseanne Barr were serious considerations by producers in 1987 for the role of Peggy Bundy on the series Married... With Children, one year before the Roseanne series went into development. The role of Peggy Bundy was ultimately won by Sagal, who would then later replace Barr on The Conners as Dan's second wife.

On May 13, 2022, ABC renewed the series for a fifth season. which premiered on September 21, 2022. In August 2022, Michael Fishman confirmed that his character D.J. Conner would be written out of the show for the fifth season. He did not give an explanation for the character's departure, but stated it was not his decision. On October 12, 2022, ABC ordered a full season of 22 episodes for the fifth season.

Filming
Production on the series began on August 31, 2018, at the Warner Bros. Studios lot in Burbank, California. On October 26, 2018, ABC announced it had ordered an additional episode, bringing the first season's total number to 11. Production on the third season began on August 17, 2020.

Release
The series premiered on October 16, 2018, on ABC in the United States, on CTV in Canada and on Network Ten in Australia. It began being shown in the United Kingdom on Sky Comedy on January 2, 2023.

Reception

Ratings
The Conners has been a strong and consistent performer for ABC, ranking as the #1 new comedy for the 2018 TV season in both the key demographic of adults 18-49 (2.2 rating) as well as in total viewers (9.5 million). When compared to all other broadcast network TV shows, The Conners finished the 2018-19 TV Season as the 16th highest rated program in the 18-49 demo, the third highest-rated comedy in the 18-49 demo (behind the final season of The Big Bang Theory at #1, and its spin-off Young Sheldon at #2), 31st place overall in total viewers and as the #4 comedy in total viewers (behind The Big Bang Theory, Young Sheldon, and Mom on CBS).

Even with the overall solid ratings performance of The Conners, it is worth noting that viewership has decreased drastically. The Roseanne revival finished the 2017-18 TV season with a 5.0 rating in the 18-49 demo, and 17.8 million viewers, making it the #3 show overall in both the 18-49 demo as well as in total viewers. Still, The Conners has been an undeniable hit for ABC, with its first season ratings nearly doubling the average rating of all prime time shows to air on ABC during the 2018–19 season. ABC finished that season in last place among the "big four" TV networks in the 18-49 demo (1.2 average rating) and second-to-last in total viewers with an average of just 5.6 million, making The Conners one of the few ratings bright spots on the ABC schedule.

The 2019–2020 TV season was a turbulent one for the industry, with most networks and programs seeing a rather dramatic decline in ratings. Viewership across the board has been "paltry" and "inauspicious"—a "rude awakening" for the television industry, according to Deadline. Bucking the industry trend in its second season, however, The Conners ratings were remarkably consistent from one episode to the next, down only slightly from season one. The show actually improved its rank with younger viewers; it was the #2 highest rated comedy in the 18-49 demo (with the final season of Modern Family edging it out for the top spot by around 275,000 young viewers per week). The Conners remains by far the highest-rated comedy on ABC.

 Note: The eighth and sixteenth episodes of the third season aired out their regular timeslot at Wednesday 10 pm and 9:30 pm respectively.

Critical response
The review aggregator website Rotten Tomatoes reported a 93% approval rating for season 1 based on 54 reviews from critics, with an average score of 7.86/10. Audience ratings on Rotten Tomatoes currently stands at 39% average score. The site's consensus reads, "The Conners offers the comforts of its source show, but more focus on the family's ever-evolving dynamics adds a welcome layer of working-class empathy without losing any of the laughs."
 Metacritic, which uses a weighted average, assigned a score of 75 out of 100, based on 22 critics, indicating "generally favorable reviews". As part of the conditions of receiving an advance release, critics were forbidden from divulging how Roseanne Conner was written out of the series.

Roseanne Barr said having her character killed by an opioid overdose "lent an unnecessary grim and morbid dimension to an otherwise happy family show."

Lecy Goranson received particular praise from critics for her performance in the season one episode "Miracles".

Accolades

References

External links
 
 
 

2010s American sitcoms
2020s American sitcoms
2018 American television series debuts
American Broadcasting Company original programming
American sequel television series
American television spin-offs
English-language television shows
Mass media portrayals of the working class
Roseanne
Television series about dysfunctional families
Television series about widowhood
Television shows filmed in Los Angeles
Television shows set in Illinois
Television shows about the COVID-19 pandemic
American LGBT-related sitcoms
Primetime Emmy Award-winning television series